Jerod Mayo Sr. (born February 23, 1986) is an American football coach and former linebacker who is the inside linebackers coach for the New England Patriots of the National Football League (NFL). Mayo played college football for the University of Tennessee and was drafted by the Patriots tenth overall in the 2008 NFL Draft. He was named Defensive Rookie of the Year and played for the Patriots until retiring following the 2015 season. He rejoined them as a coach in 2019.

Early years
Mayo was born in Hampton, Virginia.  He attended Kecoughtan High School in Hampton, where he earned three letters in football as a linebacker and a running back. As a senior, Mayo recorded 110 tackles, including 18 for loss, and two interceptions. Also playing running back for seven games, he picked up 1,245 rushing yards and scored 13 touchdowns and five two-point conversions during his final campaign. As a junior, he recorded 68 tackles including 22 for loss, four interceptions and three sacks and earned first-team All-District, All-Area and All-Region honors.

Considered a four-star recruit by Rivals.com, Mayo ranked eleventh among outside linebackers nationwide.
He chose Tennessee over North Carolina State, Purdue, Virginia, and Virginia Tech.

Jerod's younger brother, Deron Mayo, was a linebacker for the Calgary Stampeders of the Canadian Football League.

Playing career

College
While attending the University of Tennessee, Mayo played for the Tennessee Volunteers football team from 2004 to 2007.  After redshirting the 2004 season, he appeared in six games at weak-side outside linebacker in 2005, finishing with 13 tackles (10 solo). Mayo made the Volunteers starting lineup as a redshirt sophomore in 2006, as he started 11 contests at weak-side outside linebacker. He finished third on the team with 83 tackles (48 solos), including five sacks for minus 40 yards, 12.5 stops for losses of 51 yards and a quarterback pressure. He also recovered one fumble and deflected a pass. Rivals.com subsequently named him to their All-American second-team.

For his junior season, Mayo moved to middle linebacker and started all 14 games. Serving as the defensive squad's co-captain, he went on to register 140 tackles in 2007, the most by a Tennessee defender since Earnest Fields registered those same totals for the Volunteers in 1990. He added 1.5 quarterback sacks for minus 11 yards, 8.5 stops for losses and five quarterback pressures, and also returned an interception 34 yards for a touchdown. Mayo was a first-team All-Southeastern Conference selection and also earned All-American second-team honors by The NFL Draft Report.

National Football League
Mayo was considered one of the best linebackers available in the 2008 NFL Draft and drew comparisons to Will Witherspoon. Sporting News described Mayo as a “perfect fit to play one of the inside spots” in a 3-4 defense.

New England Patriots

The New England Patriots selected Mayo in the first round (10th overall) of the 2008 NFL Draft. Mayo was the second linebacker drafted in 2008, behind Keith Rivers.

2008 season
On July 24, 2008, the New England Patriots signed Mayo to a five-year contract (rather than the six-year maximum allowed by the NFL's collective bargaining agreement) worth $18.9 million, including $13.8 million in bonuses and guarantees. Mayo was the only rookie in the Patriots' 2008 class to start in Week 1, and played every snap for the defense.

Mayo was named the NFL's Defensive Rookie of the Month for October 2008. He led the Patriots with 24 tackles for the month, including 11 against the Denver Broncos in his first Monday Night Football appearance. In the Patriots' Thursday Night Football game on November 13, 2008, against their division rivals, the New York Jets, Mayo led all defensive players with 20 tackles (16 solo, 4 assisted), the first 20-tackle game of his career.

At the end of the 2008 season, in which Mayo had 128 total tackles (100 solo, 28 assists) and a forced fumble, he was named AP Defensive Rookie of the Year for 2008 in a near-unanimous vote: Mayo received 49 of 50 votes cast, with Cincinnati Bengals linebacker Keith Rivers receiving the other vote.

2009 season
Mayo was injured in the Patriots' 2009 season opener against the Buffalo Bills. The sprained MCL in his knee was originally expected to keep him out 6–8 weeks, but he returned in Week 5 against the Denver Broncos. Mayo finished the 2009 season with 103 tackles and 1.5 sacks.

2010 season
In 2010, Mayo was named a defensive captain. In Week 4 against the Miami Dolphins, Mayo recorded 16 tackles, and two weeks later notched 18 tackles in an overtime win over the Baltimore Ravens. In Week 8, Mayo recorded 14 tackles in a win over the Minnesota Vikings. Against the Indianapolis Colts in Week 11, Mayo recorded 15 tackles in a win. In Week 12, Mayo's eight tackles gave him 132 on the season, surpassing his previous career high of 128, set in 2008. He added another 12 tackles in Week 13 against the New York Jets, and had 16 in Week 15 against the Green Bay Packers. He ended the season with a league-high 175 tackles, along with two sacks and one forced fumble.

He was named as a reserve to the 2011 Pro Bowl on January 2, 2011. In the same season he was named to the 2010 All Pro team.

On December 17, 2011, at the beginning of Week 15, it was announced that he had signed a 5-year contract extension with the Patriots.

2011 season
In 2011, he missed 3 games due to injuries but still managed to eclipse the 100-tackle mark. Mayo and the Patriots reached Super Bowl XLVI. In the game, Mayo had 11 tackles but the Patriots lost to the New York Giants by a score of 21–17.

2012 season

He was voted a defensive co-captain by his teammates for the fourth straight year.

On November 16, 2012, Mayo was fined $10,000 for a late hit out of bounds on Week 10 against C. J. Spiller with the Buffalo Bills. This drew an unnecessary roughness call.

Later in the year, he was selected in the 2013 Pro Bowl in recognition of his successful 2012 season.

2013 season
Mayo was placed on injured reserve on October 16 after tearing his pectoral muscle on October 13 in a Patriots comeback win against the New Orleans Saints.

2014 season
On October 16, Mayo was placed on injured reserve with a torn patellar tendon that he suffered in a game against the Buffalo Bills in Week 6.

Without Mayo, the Patriots won Super Bowl XLIX after they defeated the defending champion Seattle Seahawks by a score of 28–24.

2015 season
Mayo's playing time dipped in the 2015 season, being behind Dont'a Hightower and Jamie Collins on the depth chart. On January 19, 2016, days before the AFC Championship against the Denver Broncos, Mayo was placed on injured reserve with a shoulder injury. 2015 was the third consecutive year his season ended early.

On February 16, 2016, Mayo posted a message on his Instagram account announcing his retirement, thanking the Patriots for the previous eight years.

Professional reputation
Mayo has a well-known work ethic that has earned him a reputation as a player who shows up early, stays late, watches film, practices hard, and puts himself through intense workouts in the team’s weight room. Mayo’s positive attitude was highlighted in Michael Holley’s book “War Room”:
”Mayo had been a top ten pick who didn’t act like one. On draft day, when the best of the best are invited to New York, often wearing made-for-occasion tailored suits, Mayo had been home in Virginia with his family raking leaves.  He was a worker there and a worker in Foxboro. In the off season, he’d come to the stadium and watch film, even when there were no coaches to be found. He loved the game, and it could be seen by the way he played middle linebacker, never turning down the opportunity to plug a hole or run sideline to sideline.”

NFL career statistics

Regular season

Coaching career

New England Patriots
On March 27, 2019, Mayo was hired by the New England Patriots to be their inside linebackers coach.

Personal life
Mayo is married to Chantel Mayo. The couple have three daughters and a son.  The family resides in North Attleborough, Massachusetts.

Mayo has two brothers, both of whom played college football as linebackers. His younger brother, Deron Mayo, played in the Canadian Football League, and is currently the assistant strength and conditioning coach for the New England Patriots. His brother Derek Mayo is a graduate of Richmond, where he won the NCAA Football Championship Subdivision title in 2008.

References

External links

New England Patriots bio
Tennessee Volunteers bio 

1986 births
Living people
African-American coaches of American football
African-American players of American football
American football middle linebackers
National Football League Defensive Rookie of the Year Award winners
New England Patriots coaches
New England Patriots players
People from Foxborough, Massachusetts
Players of American football from Virginia
Sportspeople from Hampton, Virginia
Tennessee Volunteers football players
People from Hampton, Virginia
21st-century African-American sportspeople
20th-century African-American people
American Conference Pro Bowl players
Ed Block Courage Award recipients